Belarusian Player of the Year is a football award given annually since 1983 to the most outstanding Belarusian footballer. From 1983 to 1990 the voting was arranged by the newspaper Физкультурник Белоруссии (Fizkulturnik Belorussii). Since 1991 the voting is held by Belarusian newspaper Прессбол (Pressball). The votes are given by managers, coaches and captains of Belarusian full and U21 national teams, Belarusian Premier League clubs, Belarusian referees, football specialists, journalists and BFF workers.

Winners

Voting results

2016

2015

2014

2013

2012

2011

2010

2009

2008

2007

2006

2005

2004

2003

2002

2001

External links
Hleb lands Belarusian award (c) uefa.com
List of all awarded players in Russian

References

European football trophies and awards

Awards established in 1983
1983 establishments in Belarus
Belarusian awards
Annual events in Belarus
Association football player non-biographical articles